Paul Donovan may refer to:

 Paul Donovan (writer) (born 1954), Canadian television and film writer, director and producer
 Paul Donovan (athlete) (born 1963), Irish middle and long distance runner
 Paul Donovan (businessman), CEO of the eircom Group plc
 Paul Vincent Donovan (1924–2011), bishop of the Catholic Church in the United States
 Paul Donovan (economist), author and Global Chief Economist of UBS Wealth Management